Qaleh Kazem (also Romanized as Qal‘eh Kāz̧em) is a village in Oshtorinan Rural District, Oshtorinan District, Borujerd County, Lorestan Province, Iran. At the 2006 census, its population was 70, in 18 families.

References 

Towns and villages in Borujerd County